The 1980–81 Major Indoor Soccer League season was the third in league history and would end with the New York Arrows  repeating once again as MISL champions.

Recap
There were plenty of changes as the league began its third year. The Houston Summit would move to Baltimore and the Detroit Lightning moved to San Francisco. Three new clubs were added – the Chicago Horizons, the Denver Avalanche and the Phoenix Inferno.

With 12 teams, the league moved to three divisions. To accommodate the three-division setup, the playoff format was tweaked once again. The top two teams in each division would qualify, along with the next best two teams for eight qualifiers in total. While the first round was a best of three series, Commissioner Earl Foreman announced in early November 1980 that there would be single-game semifinals and a final set to be played in St. Louis on the weekend of March 27, 1981.

As it turned out, St. Louis pulled off a worst-to-first turnaround in their division with the second-best record in the MISL and made the championship game. In their semifinal against Wichita, the Steamers rallied from a 6-1 third quarter deficit to tie the game and win in a shootout. Over 33,000 fans attended both nights at the St. Louis Arena.

New York's Steve Zungul won regular season MVP honors for the third time, and added the playoff MVP. Zungul scored four goals and an assist in both the semifinal win over Baltimore and the championship game. Zungul scored the game-winning goal with less than 30 seconds left against St. Louis, the last of his combined 123 goals (108 regular season and 15 playoff goals, respectively). The 108 goals would remain an MISL record through the end of the league in 1992.

After the season, Chicago folded. The league wanted to return to the market, but Chicago Sting owner Lee Stern paid to keep the Chicago market for himself and the Sting.

Teams

Regular Season Schedule

The 1980–81 regular season schedule ran from November 7, 1980, to March 8, 1981. The 40 games per team was an increase of eight over the 1979–80 schedule of 32 games.

Final standings

Playoff teams in bold.

Playoffs

Quarterfinals

Semifinals

Championship Game

Regular Season Player Statistics

Scoring leaders

GP = Games Played, G = Goals, A = Assists, Pts = Points

Leading Goalkeepers

Note: GP = Games played; Min = Minutes played; GA = Goals against; GAA = Goals against average; W = Wins; L = Losses

Playoff Player Statistics

Scoring leaders

GP = Games Played, G = Goals, A = Assists, Pts = Points

Leading Goalkeepers

Note: GP = Games played; Min = Minutes played; GA = Goals against; GAA = Goals against average; W = Wins; L = Losses

All-MISL Teams

League awards
 Most Valuable Player: Steve Zungul, New York
 Scoring Champion: Steve Zungul, New York
 Pass Master: Jorgen Kristiansen, Wichita
 Rookie of the Year: Don Ebert, St. Louis
 Goalkeeper of the Year: Enzo DiPede, Chicago
 Coach of the Year: Don Popovic, New York
 Championship Series Most Valuable Player: Steve Zungul, New York

References

External links
 The Year in American Soccer - 1981
 1980-81 summary at The MISL: A Look Back

Major Indoor Soccer League (1978–1992) seasons
Major
Major